Charles William Molyneux, 1st Earl of Sefton (11 October 1748 – 31 January 1795) was a Member of the British Parliament and a member of the peerage of Ireland.

He was born on 11 October 1748, the son of Thomas and Mary (née Leverly) Molyneux. Thomas died on 3 September 1756, leaving him the heir to the title 8th Viscount Molyneux, which he inherited at the age of 10 on 30 March 1759 following the death of his uncle, William Molyneux, 7th Viscount Molyneux. He married Lady Isabella Stanhope, daughter of William Stanhope, 2nd Earl of Harrington, on 27 November 1768. He conformed to the Church of England on 5 March 1769, for which he was rewarded the title Earl of Sefton on 30 November 1771 with which the viscountcy was merged. He was elected to the House of Commons in 1771 and represented the Lancashire constituency as a Whig until 1774.

He died in either late December 1794 or January 1795 and was succeeded by his only son, William.

References

 

1748 births
1790s deaths
British MPs 1768–1774
Molyneux, William Molyneux, 8th Viscount
Whig (British political party) MPs
Whig (British political party) politicians
Earls of Sefton